Kornilov and Kornilova (feminine) is a common Russian surname derived from the baptismal name Kornil. Notable people with this surname include:

Aleksandr Kornilov (1862–1925), Russian historian and politician
Aleksandr Kornilov (born 1985), Russian Olympic rower
Boris Kornilov (1907–1938), Soviet poet
Denis Kornilov (born 1986), Russian ski jumper
Ivan Kornilov (1899–1953), Soviet general
Konstantin Kornilov (1879–1957), Soviet psychologist 
Lavr Kornilov (1870–1918), Russian general and one of the leaders of the White Movement
Lev Kornilov (born 1984), Russian professional footballer
Roman Kornilov (born 1981), Kyrgyzstani football player
Sergey Kornilov (born 1978), Russian Olympic speedskater
Vladimir Kornilov (1806–1854), Russian admiral, killed during the Battle of Malakoff
Yevgeni Kornilov (born 1985), Russian football player

See also
Russian cruiser Admiral Kornilov (1887)
Kornilov Affair

References

Russian-language surnames